The 1990–91 Copa del Rey was the 89th staging of the Spanish Cup. The competition began on 5 September 1990 and ended on 29 June 1991 with the final.

First round

Second round

Third round

Fourth round

|}

Fifth round

|}

First leg

Second leg

Round of 16

|}

First leg

Second leg

Quarter-finals

|}

First leg

Second leg

Semi-finals

|}

First leg

Second leg

Final

|}

External links
 rsssf.com
 linguasport.com

Copa del Rey seasons
1990–91 in Spanish football cups